Andersons Primary School is a state run Primary school serving the town of Forres, Scotland.

History
In 1814 a local man by the name of Jonathan Anderson founded Anderson's Free School on the site of Forres House Community Centre. This later became Anderson's Institute, then Forres Academy before being converted to a Primary School in 1971. In 1926 the main teaching block of 13 Classrooms were built to supplement the original hall/gymnasium and 2 general purpose rooms.

Listed Status
The front block of Anderson Primary School which faces the high street has been a category B listed building since 1983

References

Primary schools in Moray
Forres
Listed schools in Scotland
Category B listed buildings in Moray